Nakul Pinthong or Kittisak Pinthong, (born June 26, 1987), is a Thai former professional footballer who played as an attacking midfielder.

External links
 Profile at Goal

1987 births
Living people
Nakul Pinthong
Nakul Pinthong
Association football midfielders
Nakul Pinthong
Nakul Pinthong
Nakul Pinthong